Erik Hiljus (born December 25, 1972) is a former right-handed Major League Baseball pitcher. Hiljus was drafted by the New York Mets in the 4th round of the 1991 amateur draft but did not debut in the major leagues until September 10, 1999, with the Detroit Tigers.  Hiljus played for the Tigers in 1999 and 2000 and the Oakland Athletics in 2001 and 2002. In four seasons he earned a record of 8-3 with a 4.72 career ERA in 124 innings pitched.

See also
 List of Major League Baseball single-inning strikeout leaders

References 

Living people
1972 births
Detroit Tigers players
Major League Baseball pitchers
Baseball players from Los Angeles
Oakland Athletics players
People from Panorama City, Los Angeles
American expatriate baseball players in Australia
Arkansas Travelers players
Binghamton Mets players
Capital City Bombers players
Gulf Coast Mets players
Jacksonville Suns players
Kingsport Mets players
Lakeland Tigers players
Sacramento River Cats players
St. Lucie Mets players
Toledo Mud Hens players